Santísima Trinidad was a galleon destined for merchant shipping between the Philippines and México. She was one  of the largest of the Manila galleons; officially named Santísima Trinidad y Nuestra Señora del Buen Fin, and was familiarly known as The Mighty. She is not to be confused with Nuestra Señora de la Santísima Trinidad, the biggest warship in the world in its time, which was scuttled after the Battle of Trafalgar in 1805.

Construction
Armed with 60 guns, her keel was laid in Bagatao Island shipyard (Real Astillero) Sorsogon in 1751 with a carrying capacity of 2,000 tons.  With a length of 167 feet and a beam of 50 feet, she was "one of the largest galleons ever built in the Philippines," able to carry 5,068 crates of cargo.  Orders came from the Governor-General of the Philippines Don Francisco José de Ovando, 1st Marquis of Brindisi. Her large volume and some construction errors made modifications necessary in 1757 to reduce her displacement.

Voyage of 1755

In 1755, the Santísima Trinidad, steered by French pilot Antoine Lemaire de Boucourt, made a bad voyage from Manila to Acapulco which lasted 221 days and is said to be the third longest in the history of the line; it started on 23d of July, 1755, with 435 persons  on board, of whom 74 died on the way, by tabardillo, a kind of typhus, and/or by lack of water (rainfall). Among the victims were former Governor General of the Philippines Marquis Ovando and his young son, who was only eight days old. The voyage ended in Acapulco, after a long stop in San José del Cabo, on 27 February 1756.

Capture

On 3 Sept. 1762 she departed from Cavite towards Acapulco, but due to a severe storm near the Marianas, she lost a mast. The captain decided to return to the Philippines for repair, unaware that Manila had fallen into British hands after the Battle of Manila.

The ship was intercepted by  fourth-rate 60-gun  under captain Hyde Parker and the  sixth-rate  of 28 guns under Richard King. Panther opened fire, but did little damage to her thick wooden hull and caused few casualties. Nevertheless, the disheartened crew of Santísima Trinidad decided to surrender. On board was cargo valued at $1.5 million, besides the value of the ship at $3 million.  Previously, Filipina had been captured with her cargo of American silver from Acapulco.

The ship was taken to Portsmouth, where her sale earned the two captains 30,000 pounds, a fortune at that time. It is not known what happened to the ship after the sale but she was probably scrapped.

See also
 Francisco José de Ovando, 1st Marquis of Brindisi

References

Sources

 
  - For the complete article with passenger lists see the print version in: Revista de Historia Naval 88 (2005), S.57-82; Online available: https://armada.defensa.gob.es/ArmadaPortal/page/Portal/ArmadaEspannola/mardigitalrevistas/prefLang-es/03revistaHistoriaNaval--01catalogoRevista
 

Ships of the Spanish Navy
Age of Sail merchant ships of Spain
1751 ships
Galleons
Ships built in the Philippines